Meadow Branch is a  long 2nd order tributary to Richardson Creek in Union County, North Carolina.

Course
Meadow Branch rises about 1 mile southeast of Wingate, North Carolina and then flows north-northwest to join Richardson Creek about 2.5 miles southwest of Watson.

Watershed
Meadow Branch drains  of area, receives about 48.5 in/year of precipitation, has a wetness index of 444.40, and is about 26% forested.

References

Rivers of North Carolina
Rivers of Union County, North Carolina